Isolatorweg metro station is the terminus of the Amsterdam metro 50 (Ringlijn) and opened on 28 May 1997. From 3 March 2019 this is also the terminus of the Amsterdam metro 51. The station is a railway embankment near the Isolatorweg on an industrial estate close to an electric generating station in the western harbour area of Amsterdam. Since there are no nearby residential areas, the station attracts relatively few visitors. The station has an island platform in the middle of a central access. Isolatorweg is the third metro station in Amsterdam that does not have an escalator.

The station takes its name from the Isolatorweg street, which itself refers to the electrical isolator. Other street names in the area include Generatorstraat, Elektronstraat, and Magneetstraat.

References

Amsterdam Metro stations
Railway stations opened in 1997
1997 establishments in the Netherlands
Railway stations in the Netherlands opened in the 20th century